A by-election was held for the New South Wales Legislative Assembly electorate of Northumberland on 23 December  1862 because Thomas Lewis resigned, as he was unable to afford to attend to the Legislative Assembly at a time when members were not paid. He accepted an appointment as an inspector of coal fields in February 1863.

Dates

Polling places

Result

Thomas Lewis was insolvent and resigned.

See also
Electoral results for the district of Northumberland
List of New South Wales state by-elections

References

1862 elections in Australia
New South Wales state by-elections
1860s in New South Wales